Todd Matthews-Jouda (born June 20, 1979) is a hurdling athlete, who is notable for having switched nationality from United States to Sudan in September 2003. His personal best is 13.36 seconds, but being set in 2002 (i.e. before he switched to Sudan), it is not a national record. Instead, his Sudanese record is 13.45, a result which he achieved in October 2004.

His first major international tournament for Sudan was the 2003 Afro-Asian Games, where he won a gold medal. Competing for his new nation, Matthews-Jouda became African champion in July 2004 and competed at the Summer Olympics a month later. He was in fact selected as flag bearer for Sudan.

He finished last in his heat at the 2005 World Championships.

Major achievements

External links

1979 births
Living people
Sudanese male hurdlers
Athletes (track and field) at the 2004 Summer Olympics
Olympic athletes of Sudan
Clemson Tigers men's track and field athletes
American male hurdlers
World Athletics Championships athletes for Sudan
African Games silver medalists for Sudan
African Games medalists in athletics (track and field)
Athletes (track and field) at the 2003 All-Africa Games
Islamic Solidarity Games competitors for Sudan
Islamic Solidarity Games medalists in athletics